Vice-Admiral John Ford (17 December 1738 – 14 September 1796) was a Royal Navy officer who served as Commander-in-Chief of the Jamaica Station.

Naval career
Promoted to post-captain on 25 June 1773, Ford was appointed to the command of the post ship  in April 1776 in which he saw action at the capture of American frigate  in September 1778 and the action of 13 May 1779. He commissioned the sixth-rate  in July 1779 and then transferred to the command of fifth-rate  in which he saw action at the Battle of the Chesapeake in September 1781 during the American Revolutionary War and again at the Battle of the Saintes in April 1782 during the Anglo-French War.

Haitian Revolution
Ford went on to become Commander-in-Chief of the Jamaica Station with his flag in the fourth-rate  in 1793.

During the Haitian Revolution, at the request of French Royalists he mounted a campaign against Saint-Domingue and Jérémie in the Caribbean.

Promoted to rear-admiral, Ford commanded a squadron commanded that accompanied Brigadier-General John Whyte that briefly captured Port-au-Prince in 1794. At the time some forty five vessels lay in harbour and these were all made prizes.

References

Sources

Royal Navy vice admirals
1796 deaths
Royal Navy personnel of the American Revolutionary War